Leroy Barton Heiser (born June 22, 1942) is an American former professional baseball player.

Heiser graduated from Catonsville High School and attended the University of Maryland. He was signed by the expansion Senators during their maiden, 1961 season and spent much of the campaign in the Class D Appalachian League, but was recalled by Washington in September. In three relief appearances, largely in a mop-up role, Heiser allowed six hits and nine bases on balls in 5 innings pitched, with one strikeout. 

He returned to the Senators' farm system in 1962 and toiled there for five more seasons without returning to the majors.

External links

1942 births
Living people
Baseball players from Baltimore
Burlington Senators players
Major League Baseball pitchers
Maryland Terrapins baseball players
Middlesboro Senators players
Peninsula Senators players
Raleigh Capitals players
Rocky Mount Senators players
Washington Senators (1961–1971) players
York White Roses players